Amphidromus latestrigatus is a species of air-breathing land snail, a terrestrial pulmonate gastropod mollusc in the family Camaenidae. It is found in Indonesia and lives on trees bushes.

References 

latestrigatus
Fauna of Indonesia
Gastropods described in 1892